King of Horrorcore, Vol. 1 is the debut official mixtape and the second solo record by American horrorcore rapper King Gordy. It was released in 2006 via Morbid Music L.L.C.

A sequel to the album, King of Horrorcore 2, was released on August 13, 2009.

Track listing
All tracks composed and written by Waverly W. Alford III, except where noted

References

External links

King Gordy albums
2006 mixtape albums